The Ständige Konferenz der Innenminister und -senatoren der Länder (Standing Conference of Interior Ministers and Senators of the States) or Innenministerkonferenz (Conference of Interior Ministers, abbr. IMK) is a regular conference on security and law enforcement issues in the Länder (states) of Germany. It is attended by all sixteen state Interior Ministers (in some states Interior Senators), with the Federal Minister of the Interior taking part as a guest. The chairmanship rotates on an annual basis. In 2018, the chair is Holger Stahlknecht (CDU), Interior Minister of Sachsen-Anhalt.

History and procedures
The conference was founded in 1954 to establish a collaboration of the Interior Ministers of the German states on a political level, beyond the state and federal authorities.

Meetings are held usually twice a year. Special meetings can be held due to political developments or in emergency situations. Resolutions are adopted unanimously and can also be made in silence procedures. Since 2000, the decisions are public. There are six working groups (Arbeitskreis, AK):

 AK I - State Law and Administration (including Constitutional Law, Alien Law, Data Privacy, Administrative Law)
 AK II - Inner Security (including Active Defense, Defense against Terrorism, Police Issues)
 AK III - Municipal Issues
 AK IV - Protection of the Constitution
 AK V - Fire Fighting Issues, Rescue Services, Disaster Prevention and Civil Defense
 AK VI - Organisation, Public Service Law and Personnel

See also
Kultusministerkonferenz

References

External links
 Official homepage of the Innenministerkonferenz
 News regarding Innenministerkonferenz at Frankfurter Allgemeine, in German

Government of Germany
National security of Germany
1954 establishments in West Germany